Kenneth Irvin Devore (August 3, 1927 – August 13, 1997) was an American lawyer and politician. He represented it and Montgomery County and Radford in the Virginia House of Delegates for two terms before being nominated to serve as a judge of Virginia's 27th Circuit Court.

References

External links 

1927 births
1997 deaths
Democratic Party members of the Virginia House of Delegates
20th-century American politicians